Garadag District is a district in the Sanaag region of Somaliland. Its capital lies at Garadag.

Demographics 
The district is wholly dominated by the Reer Iidle subdivision of the Habr Je'lo clan, part of the wider Isaaq clan-family.

See also
Administrative divisions of Somaliland
Regions of Somaliland
Districts of Somaliland
Somalia–Somaliland border

References 

Districts of Somaliland
Sanaag